The Centre for Earthquake Studies (CES) is a federally funded research institute and national laboratory dedicated to the advancement in understanding of natural vibration, seismology, and yield-based energy measurement of seismic waves.

The CES was established through federal funding as a direct response to the devastating 2005 Kashmir earthquake in order to understand earthquakes and provide scientific prediction of quakes to improve earthquake preparedness. The CES is the only national site in Pakistan working on earthquake precursors.

The national laboratory is headquartered in the campus area of the National Centre for Physics (NCP) and conducts mathematical research in earth sciences, in close coordination with the NCP.

History

The national site was founded by the Government of Pakistan on the advice of the science adviser Dr. Ishfaq Ahmad. The establishment of the national site came in response to Pakistans' deadliest earthquake, the 2005 Kashmir earthquake on 8 October 2005. Initially created as the Earthquake Studies Department at the National Centre for Physics, it gained independence shortly after its establishment. The CES undertakes research studies in the development of expertise in anomalous geophysical phenomenon prior to seismic activity. The CES primarily produces its research outcomes by using computer simulation and mathematical modelling to interpret seismic activity and give earthquake predictions.

The CES's campus also includes the various ATROPATENA stations network, and supports its research and development with close collaboration with the Global Network for the Forecasting of Earthquakes. Its first and founding director was Dr. Ahsan Mubarak who is still designated as the CES's senior scientist. Currently, Dr. Muhammad Qaisar is the CES's current administrator.

Galleries

See also
2005 Pakistan earthquake

Notes

Official links
Official website

Science and technology in Pakistan
Nuclear weapons programme of Pakistan
Pakistan federal departments and agencies
2005 establishments in Pakistan
Geology organizations
Laboratories in Pakistan
Earth science research institutes
International research institutes
Research institutes in Pakistan
Science parks in Pakistan
2005 Kashmir earthquake
Earthquake engineering